Azamat Kustubayev is a Kazakhstani Greco-Roman wrestler. He won one of the bronze medals in the 87 kg event at the 2018 Asian Games held in Jakarta, Indonesia.

In 2019, he won the bronze medal in the 87 kg event at the Asian Wrestling Championships held in Xi'an, China. He repeated this at the 2020 Asian Wrestling Championships held in New Delhi, India.

Achievements

References

External links 

Living people
Year of birth missing (living people)
Place of birth missing (living people)
Kazakhstani male sport wrestlers
Wrestlers at the 2018 Asian Games
Asian Games medalists in wrestling
Asian Games bronze medalists for Kazakhstan
Medalists at the 2018 Asian Games
Asian Wrestling Championships medalists
21st-century Kazakhstani people